Dunvant and Killay, formerly Dunvant, is an electoral ward in the City and County of Swansea, Wales, UK. It is named after the village of Dunvant and neighbouring Killay, which lie within the ward.

The electoral ward consisted of some or all of the following areas, Derlwyn, Dunvant, Killay, in the parliamentary constituency of Swansea West.  It is bounded by Fairwood to the west; Gowerton to the north; Sketty to the east.

2022 boundary changes
Until 2022, Dunvant and Killay consisted of three wards: Dunvant represented by two councillors; Killay North and Killay South represented by one councillor each. Following a local authority ward boundary review, the three wards were merged to become 'Dunvant and Killay', with an overal reduction in councillors to three. A local petition to oppose the changes was unsuccessful.

2012 Swansea Council election
In the 2012 local council elections the turnout for Dunvant was 38.94%.  The results were:

References

Swansea electoral wards